The Bandy World Championship is a competition between bandy-playing nations' men's teams. The tournament is administrated by the Federation of International Bandy. It is distinct from the Bandy World Cup, a club competition, and from the Women's Bandy World Championship. A Youth Bandy World Championship also exists separately from the senior competition and has competitions in both the male and female categories.

The 2020 Bandy World Championship for Division A was scheduled to be played in Irkutsk, Russia in 2020 but was postponed twice due to the COVID-19 pandemic.

The 2021 Bandy World Championship for Division A and B was initially scheduled to be played in Syktyvkar, Russia, but was postponed due to the COVID-19 pandemic. The tournament was rescheduled for Division B to 8–13 March 2022 and for Division A to 27 March–3 April 2022. However, in response to the Russian invasion of Ukraine, Finland and Sweden withdrew from the tournament, which was then postponed indefinitely.

History
Although bandy has been played since the 19th century, the first men's world championships were only played as recently as 1957, and the first women's championships not until 2004.

Before this, friendlies had been played regularly between the Nordic countries. A film from British Pathé created in 1935 called "Ice Hockey At Helsingfors On Sleeve As Ice Hockey At Halsingfors News In A Nutshell (1935)" shows an international bandy match between women bandy players from Finland and women bandy players from Sweden being played outdoors at Helsingfors Ice Stadium (Helsinki) in Finland where the narrator corrects the misconception that it is an international women's ice hockey game. Helsingfors is the Swedish name for Helsinki and comes from the name of the surrounding parish, Helsinge (etymological origin of the Finnish name Helsinki) and the rapids (in Swedish: fors), which flowed through the original town.

A bandy tournament for men was held as a demonstration sport at the 1952 Winter Olympics in Oslo, but this had no world championship status. A four nation tournament in 1954 for men was played in Moscow, this was the first time the Soviet Union met teams from other countries and the first time the new, jointly agreed rules were used, however this was not called a world championship. The international federation was founded in 1955 by the four countries which had men's national bandy teams who had played in Moscow.

The first ever men's Bandy World Championship was organised in 1957 in association with the 50th anniversary of the Ball Association of Finland, which at the time was the governing body of bandy in Finland. It was played at the Helsinki Olympic Stadium.

From 1961 to 2003, the men's championships were played every two years, but since then has been played annually. (During the period 1972–1990, the Rossiya Tournament was held for national teams in the years when there was no world championship. This was always played in the Soviet Union and arranged by newspaper Sovetskaya Rossiya. It was affectionately called "the small world championship".)

Participating nations

For a long time, only four countries competed at the world championships: the Soviet Union, Sweden, Finland and Norway, with the Soviet Union the dominating country. Since then, more countries have joined the tournaments, starting with the United States in 1985. The interest in the sport has spread to other parts of Europe, North America and Asia, and the dissolution of the Soviet Union in 1991 also opened the way for separate national teams from the former Soviet republics. Somalia became the first team from Africa to compete, in the 2014 tournament in Irkutsk. The record number of participants is 20, set in 2019.

Denmark, Switzerland, Armenia and Poland are countries that a few years ago expressed interest in participating in future tournaments. Denmark and Poland have left FIB, while Switzerland debuted in the 2019 edition, as did  Great Britain. Armenia wished to participate in the 2011, but was not allowed to, as the tournament format at the time only allowed twelve teams and several more wanted to come. Of the countries which still have not taken part, India was also denied in 2011. Most probably also Lithuania. The reason for the 2011 tournament having only eleven teams, was a late cancellation from Australia, another country no longer an FIB member.

With more nations competing, Group B was created in 1991. In 2012 there was a Group C for the first time as 14 countries participated. Group C was abolished in 2013, when instead two sub-groups of Group B were created. In 2014 there were two sub-groups also in Group A, increasing the number of teams in that division from six to eight. The number of groups is not fixed, it is changed from year to year and there are discussions about reinstating a Group C. Japan and Kyrgyzstan attended their first World Championships in 2012, Ukraine joined in 2013, Germany and Somalia made their debuts in 2014, China in 2015, and the Czech Republic in 2016. Russia, Finland, Sweden, Kazakhstan, Norway, USA and Belarus usually play in group A. Until 2011, the best team in group B Went into a playoff match with the team which came bottom of the A-group, replacing them if they won. In 2004 the B-pool was played in a location separate from group A for the first time, at the City Park Ice Rink in Budapest. In 2013 this happened again as Vetlanda hosted the B-pool, whereas Vänersborg was the main venue of the A-pool with three matches played at other locations, Trollhättan, Gothenburg and Oslo. In 2015 and 2016 the tournaments were separated in time while in the same cities. The Division B matches are shorter in time, except for the end matches.

Participation details

*18 teams were enrolled in 2020, but only 10 (the B division) could participate.

Competition format
Originally, the competition was played as an all-meet-all round-robin tournament. Starting in 1983, semifinals and a final was added to follow the round-robin stage.

When the number of participating nations increased, the championship was split up in two groups from 2003 onwards, A and B, with the better teams in Group A. The winner of Group B for some years played a game against the least successful team of Group A to determine qualification for Group A for next year, but in 2016, 2017, and 2018 winning Group B has been directly qualifying for group A for the following year while the last placed team of Group A is automatically relegated to Group B.

Broadcasting
The interest is biggest in Sweden, Finland and Russia. For a few times now it has been shown on Eurosport 2.

The games are also viewable via online streaming.

Results

*18 teams were enrolled in 2020, but only 10 (the B division) could participate.

Medal table
Countries in italics no longer compete at the World Championships.

Consecutive wins

The most consecutive gold medals were won by the Soviet Union with 11. Russia has won four consecutive gold medals and Sweden has won three consecutive gold medals.

Final arenas (since 1983) 
Until 1981, the championship was always decided by round-robin games, so only since 1983 there have been designated venues for the championship final game.

References

External links

 
International bandy competitions
Bandy
Recurring sporting events established in 1957
Bandy